Megachile rufobarbata is a species of bee in the family Megachilidae. It was described by Theodore Dru Alison Cockerell in 1936.

References

Rufobarbata
Insects described in 1936